"Show Me Your Soul" is a song recorded by P. Diddy, Lenny Kravitz, Pharrell Williams, and Loon. The song was released by Bad Boy and Universal as the fourth single from the soundtrack album for the 2003 film Bad Boys II, an action comedy movie directed by Michael Bay, produced by Jerry Bruckheimer, and starring Martin Lawrence and Will Smith. All instrumental parts were performed by Lenny Kravitz and Pharrell Williams. The song was aired on Soul Train on November 15, 2003. Chris Robinson directed the music video. The song "Dirrty" by Christina Aguilera was referenced in the lyrics.

Reception
Tom Sinclair of Entertainment Weekly wrote, "”Show Me Your Soul,” a propulsive mash-up that features the unlikely alliance of Diddy, Lenny Kravitz, the Neptunes’ Pharrell Williams, and a new rapper named Loon. It’s got that easily identifiable, winning Neptunes vibe and is filled with loopy pronouncements like ”It’s gettin’ sexy in here." A reviewer from IGN added, "It's typical Bad Boy flair, you know a simple, yet catchy as hell loop and groove created by Pharrell Williams and Lenny Kravitz over which the Didd lets loose with his languid flow, talking about his label, flossing, and his continued mourning of Biggie. Bad Boy newcomer Loon also drops on the track with an equally lax delivery augmented by a nice nasal twinge. Inescapably infectious."

Track listing

Charts

References

External links
 

2003 singles
2003 songs
Bad Boy Records singles
Bad Boys (franchise)
Sean Combs songs
Lenny Kravitz songs
Pharrell Williams songs
Music videos directed by Chris Robinson (director)
Song recordings produced by Sean Combs
Song recordings produced by Lenny Kravitz
Song recordings produced by the Neptunes
Songs written by Sean Combs
Songs written by Lenny Kravitz
Songs written by Loon (rapper)
Songs written by Pharrell Williams
Songs written for films
Universal Music Group singles